A process hazard analysis (PHA) (or process hazard evaluation) is a set of organized and systematic assessments of the potential hazards associated with an industrial process. A PHA provides information intended to assist managers and employees in making decisions for improving safety and reducing the consequences of unwanted or unplanned releases of hazardous chemicals. A PHA is directed toward analyzing potential causes and consequences of fires, explosions, releases of toxic or flammable chemicals and major spills of hazardous chemicals, and it focuses on equipment, instrumentation, utilities, human actions, and external factors that might impact the process.

There are varieties of methodologies that can be used to conduct a PHA, including but not limited to:
Checklist, What if?, What if?/Checklist, hazard and operability study (HAZOP), and failure mode and effects analysis (FMEA).  PHA methods are qualitative in nature.  The selection of a methodology to use depends on a number of factors, including the complexity of the process, the length of time a process has been in operation and if a PHA has been conducted on the process before, and if the process is unique, or industrially common.  Other methods such as layer of protection analysis (LOPA) or fault tree analysis (FTA) may be used after a PHA if the PHA team could not reach a risk decision for a given scenario.

In the United States, the use of PHAs is mandated by the Occupational Safety and Health Administration (OSHA) in its process safety management regulation for the identification of risks involved in the design, operation, and modification of processes that handle highly hazardous chemicals.

See also
 Cyber PHA
 Hazard analysis
 HAZOP
 ETA
 FTA
 FMEA

References

Further reading 

 Comparison of PHA Methods, a White Paper from Primatech Inc. 2017.

Chemical safety
Industrial fires and explosions
Process safety